Andrea Censori (born 25 July 1988) is an Italian footballer who plays as a midfielder.

Career 
Coming through the youth system, Censori began his senior career at local club Santegidiese. He played professionally for Arezzo, Giulianova and Valle del Giovenco (in Serie C), and non-professionally for Nerostellati, Jesina, Avezzano and Campobasso (in Serie D), and San Nicolò, Ciabbino and San Marco Servigliano (in Eccellenza).

In July 2021, Censori joined Alba Adriatica from Santegidiese ahead of the 2021–22 season on a free transfer.

References

External links 
 
 

1988 births
Living people
Sportspeople from the Province of Teramo
Footballers from Abruzzo
Italian footballers
Association football midfielders
Santegidiese Calcio S.S.D. players
S.S. Arezzo players
A.S. Pescina Valle del Giovenco players
Giulianova Calcio players
S.S.D. Città di Campobasso players
Avezzano Calcio players
S.S.D. Jesina Calcio players
Serie D players
Lega Pro Seconda Divisione players
Serie C players
Eccellenza players